Schiltigheim (and sometimes  by non-local speakers of French; Alsatian: Schelige) is a commune in the Bas-Rhin department in Grand Est in north-eastern France.

The inhabitants are called Schilikois in French and Scheligemer in Alsatian.

It is the largest suburb of the city of Strasbourg, and is adjacent to it on Strasbourg's north side. In 2017, Schiltigheim was the third-most populous commune in the Bas-Rhin (after Strasbourg and Haguenau), with a total population of 31,894.

History

The town dates back to the 9th century, when it grew around the Sciltung castle and the Bothebür chapel in a place called Skitingsdtböhel.

Population

Events

The present or former home of a number of breweries, Schiltigheim is known for the "fête de la bière" beer festival in August.

Notable people

Christian Ernst Stahl, (1848-1919), botanist, born in Schiltigheim
Ernst Barthel (1890-1953) born in Schiltigheim, philosopher, mathematician, inventor
Jean Weissenbach (1946-), biologist and director of research at CNRS. Was at the primary school Exen Schiltigheim. Currently leads the Genoscope in Évry. In April 2010, the town of Schiltigheim awarded him the title of honorary citizen.
Yvon Riemer (1970-), wrestler, member of Olympia Schiltigheim. World champion Greco-Roman wrestling in 1995, silver in 1999 and bronze in 1991 and 1993. 5th Olympic Games in Barcelona in 1992
Thomas Voeckler, cyclist, born in 1979 in Schiltigheim
Bruno Spengler, racing driver, born in 1983 in Schiltigheim
Pierre-Hugues Herbert (1991-), tennis player, 5-time doubles Grand Slam champion

See also
Communes of the Bas-Rhin department

References

External links

 Official website

Communes of Bas-Rhin
Bas-Rhin communes articles needing translation from French Wikipedia